Spot: The Cool Adventure is a 1992 platform game developed by Visual Concepts and published by Virgin Games for the Game Boy. It is a port of the NES game, M.C. Kids. This Game Boy version was released outside of Europe, but was localized with the Cool Spot character, as Spot: The Cool Adventure.

The game structure is based on M.C. Kids, although the map screen closely resembles Super Mario Bros. 3. Getting hit causes players to lose health. In addition to avoiding enemies, Spot can either jump or collect blocks that are need to collect hard-to-reach spots and hearts.

See also
 Cool Spot
 Spot: The Video Game

References

1992 video games
Advergames
Works based on advertisements
Drink advertising characters
Game Boy-only games
McDonald's video games
Platform games
Side-scrolling video games
Game Boy games
Video games about food and drink
Video games developed in the United States